



























Lists of country codes